Procambarus latipleurum is a species of crayfish in the family Cambaridae. It is endemic to Gulf County, Florida, and is listed as Data Deficient on the IUCN Red List.

References

Cambaridae
Endemic fauna of Florida
Freshwater crustaceans of North America
Crustaceans described in 1942
Taxa named by Horton H. Hobbs Jr.
Taxonomy articles created by Polbot